The Holocaust in Ukraine took place in the Reichskommissariat Ukraine, the General Government, the Crimean General Government and some areas which were located to the East of Reichskommissariat Ukraine (all of those areas were under the military control of Nazi Germany), in the Transnistria Governorate and Northern Bukovina (both areas under the control of Romania, with the latter being re-annexed) and Carpathian Ruthenia (then part of Hungary) during World War II. The listed areas are currently parts of Ukraine. Between 1941 and 1944, more than a million Jews living in the Soviet Union, almost all from Ukraine and Belarus, were murdered by Nazi Germany's "Final Solution" extermination policies and with the help of local Ukrainian collaborators. Most of them were killed in Ukraine because most pre-WWII Soviet Jews lived in the Pale of Settlement, of which Ukraine was the largest part. The major massacres against Jews mainly occurred during the first phase of the occupation, although they continued until the return of the Red Army of the Soviet Union.

According to Yale historian Timothy D. Snyder, "the Holocaust is integrally and organically connected to the Vernichtungskrieg, the war in 1941, and it is organically and integrally connected to the attempt to conquer Ukraine." According to Wendy Lower, the genocide of the Ukrainian Jews was closely linked to German plans to exploit and colonize Ukraine.

Death squads (1941–1943)

Total civilian losses during the war and German occupation in Ukraine are estimated at four million, including up to a million Jews who were murdered by Einsatzgruppen units, Order Police battalions, Wehrmacht troops and local Nazi collaborators. Einsatzgruppe C (Otto Rasch) was assigned to north and central Ukraine, and Einsatzgruppe D (Otto Ohlendorf) to Moldavia, south Ukraine, the Crimea, and, during 1942, the north Caucasus. According to Ohlendorf's testimony at the Einsatzgruppen Trial, "the Einsatzgruppen had the mission to protect the rear of the troops by killing the Jews, Romani, Communist functionaries, active Communists, uncooperative slavs, and all persons who would endanger the security." In practice, their victims were nearly all Jewish civilians (not a single Einsatzgruppe member was killed in action during these operations). The United States Holocaust Memorial Museum tells the story of one survivor of the Einsatzgruppen in Piryatin, Ukraine, when they killed 1,600 Jews on 6 April 1942, the second day of Passover:

From 16–30 September 1941 the Nikolaev massacre in and around the city of Mykolaiv resulted in the deaths of 35,782 Soviet citizens, most of whom were Jews, as was reported to Hitler.

{{quote box |align=right |width=30% |fontsize=90%
|quote= Jews of the city of Kiev and vicinity! On Monday, September 29, you are to appear by 08:00 a.m. with your possessions, money, documents, valuables, and warm clothing at Dorogozhitskaya Street, next to the Jewish cemetery. Failure to appear is punishable by death.|source=— Order posted in Kiev in Russian and Ukrainian on or around September 26, 1941.}}

The most notorious massacre of Jews in Ukraine was at the Babi Yar ravine outside Kyiv, where 33,771 Jews were killed in a single operation on 29–30 September 1941. (Some 100,000 to 150,000 Ukrainian and other Soviet citizens were also killed in the following weeks). The mass killing of Jews in Kiev was approved by the military governor Major-General Kurt Eberhard, the Police Commander for Army Group South (SS-Obergruppenführer Friedrich Jeckeln) and the Einsatzgruppe C Commander Otto Rasch. It was carried out by a mixture of SS, SD and Security Police. On the Monday, the Jews of Kiev gathered by the cemetery, expecting to be loaded onto trains. The crowd was large enough that most of the men, women, and children could not have known what was happening until it was too late: by the time they heard the machine-gun fire, there was no chance to escape. All were driven down a corridor of soldiers, in groups of ten, and then shot. A truck driver described the scene:

 Collaboration in Ukraine 

Ukrainians who collaborated with the Nazi Germany did so in various ways including participating in the local administration, in German-supervised auxiliary police, Schutzmannschaft, in the German military, and serving as concentration camp guards. The National Geographic reported:
A number of Ukrainians had collaborated: According to German historian Dieter Pohl, around 100,000 joined police units that provided key assistance to the Nazis. Many others staffed the local bureaucracies or lent a helping hand mass shootings of Jews. Ukrainians, such as the infamous Ivan the Terrible of Treblinka, were also among the guards who manned the German Nazi death camps.

Timothy Snyder notes that "the majority, probably the vast majority of people who collaborated with the German occupation were not politically motivated. They were collaborating with an occupation that was there, and which is a German historical responsibility."

Widespread coordination between the Third Reich and Ukrainian nationalists, Ukrainian militia and rank-and-file pogromists occurred. Prior to the German invasion of Ukraine, the two active OUN factions coordinated directly from their headquarters in Berlin and Krakow. The headquarters decided to create marching companies ("pohidni groopi") to accompany the German invasion of Ukraine, recruiting new members into their ranks. The OUN supported Nazi antisemitic policies. In 1941, when German official Reinhard Heydrich requested "self-cleansing actions" in June of that year the OUN organized militias who killed several thousand Jews in western Ukraine soon afterward that year. The Ukrainian People's Militia under the OUN's command led pogroms that resulted in the massacre of 6,000 Jews in Lviv soon after that city's fall to German forces. OUN members spread propaganda urging people to engage in pogroms.  A slogan put forth by the Bandera group and recorded in the 16 July 1941 Einsatzgruppen report stated: "Long live Ukraine without Jews, Poles and Germans; Poles behind the river San, Germans to Berlin, and Jews to the gallows".Philip Friedman. "Ukrainian-Jewish Relations During the Nazi Occupation." at Yivo annual of Jewish social science Yiddish Scientific Institute, 1959 p. 268 In instructions to its members concerning how the OUN should behave during the war, it declared that "in times of chaos... one can allow oneself to liquidate Polish, Russian and Jewish figures, particularly the servants of Bolshevik-Muscovite imperialism" and further, when speaking of Russians, Poles, and Jews, to "destroy in struggle, particularly those opposing the regime, by means of: deporting them to their own lands, eradicating their intelligentsia, which is not to be admitted to any governmental positions, and overall preventing any creation of this intelligentsia (e.g. access to education etc)... Jews are to be isolated, removed from governmental positions in order to prevent sabotage... Those who are deemed necessary may only work under strict supervision and removed from their positions for slightest misconduct... Jewish assimilation is not possible."

According to political scientist Ivan Katchanovski, the agreement between Ukrainian nationalists and the occupying authorities in the region was not limited to ideology, as 63% of UPA commanders by early 1944 were represented by former commanders of police formations created by Nazi Germany during the initial stage of the occupation of Ukraine. Police units and civil militia established by the Nazi authorities played the role of collaborators of the Nazis, participating not only in the genocide of the Jewish population but also in the killing of Soviet prisoners, as well as in the murder of Ukrainian civilians, such as the killing of 3,000 people in the village of Kortelitsa in September 1942.

Ukrainian police auxiliaries "had been involved at least in preparations for the Babi Yar massacre".

According to the Israeli Holocaust historian Yitzhak Arad, "In January 1942 a company of Tatar volunteers was established in Simferopol under the command of Einsatzgruppe 11. This company participated in anti-Jewish manhunts and murder actions in the rural regions."

According to The Simon Wiesenthal Center (in January 2011) "Ukraine has, to the best of our knowledge, never conducted a single investigation of a local Nazi war criminal, let alone prosecuted a Holocaust perpetrator." There had been many prosecutions in the past, but all of these trials were conducted by Soviet military and Ukrainian SSR courts, and never by Ukraine after the collapse of the Soviet Union.

Victims
According to Timothy D. Snyder, at least 1.7 million Soviet Jews were killed by Germans and their collaborators by the end of 1942, "and the Soviet Jewish populations under their control had ceased to exist." Until the fall of the Soviet Union, it was believed that about 900,000 Jews were murdered as part of the Holocaust in Ukraine. This estimate is found in renowned and respected works as The Destruction of the European Jews by Raul Hilberg. In the late 1990s, access to Soviet archives increased the estimates of the prewar population of Jews and as a result, the estimates of the death toll have been increasing. In the 1990s, Dieter Pohl  estimated that 1.2 million Jews were murdered, and more recent estimates of the death toll have been as high as 1.6 million. Some of those Jews whose names have been added to the death toll attempted to find refuge in the forest, but later on, during the German retreat, they were killed by members of the Ukrainian Insurgent Army, members of some nationalist units of the Home Army  or members of other partisan groups. According to American historian Wendy Lower, "there were many perpetrators, albeit with different political agendas, who killed Jews and suppressed this history". However, Yad Vashem research maintains that between 1 to 1.1 million Soviet Jews were murdered during the Holocaust, of them around 225,000 were from Belarus.

Execution units
 Einsatzgruppen C & D (Einsatzkommando)
 Order Police battalions
 Abwehr/Brandemburg special saboteur unit Nachtigall Battalion
 Freiwilligen-Stamm-Regiment 3 & 4 (Russians & Ukrainians)
 Ukrainian auxiliary units Schutzmannschaft as well as Ukrainische Hilfspolizei

Notable survivors

 Roald Hoffmann
 Mordechai Rokeach
 Mina Rosner
 Adam Daniel Rotfeld
 Shevah Weiss
 Simon Wiesenthal

Rescuers
Ukraine rates the 4th in the number of people recognized as "Righteous Among the Nations" for saving Jews during the Holocaust, with the total of 2,515 individuals recognized as of 1 January 2015.

The Shtundists, an evangelical Protestant denomination which emerged in late 19th century Ukraine, helped hide Jews.

Massacres
 1941 Bila Tserkva massacre
 1941 Odessa massacre
 Babi Yar 
 Dniepropetrovsk
 Drobytsky Yar
 Feodosiya
 Ivano-Frankovsk
 Kamenets-Podolskiy massacre 
 Klevan
 Lviv pogroms (1941)
 Massacre of Lwów professors
 Mezhirichi
 Mizoch
 Nikolaev massacre
 Olyka
 Pliskov
 Terebovl
 Zhytomyr

See also
 Einsatzgruppen trial
 Gas van
 German war crimes
 History of the Jews in Ukraine
 World War II casualties of the Soviet Union
 Hegewald, a short-lived German Colony near Zhytomyr
 No Place on Earth'', a 2012 documentary film about a group of Ukrainian Jews who survived the Holocaust by hiding in the Verteba and Priest's Grotto caves

Notes

References

Further reading
The Holocaust in Ukraine: New Sources and Perspectives, Center for Advanced Holocaust Studies of the United States Holocaust Memorial Museum, Conference Papers, 2013
 

 
Ukraine
Jewish Ukrainian history
Military history of Ukraine during World War II
Reichskommissariat Ukraine
World War II prisoner of war massacres
Eastern Front (World War II)
Ukraine in World War II
1940s in Ukraine